Ellen Petri (born 25 May 1982 in Merksem, Antwerp) is a Belgian beauty pageant titleholder who was crowned Miss Belgium 2004 on 12 December 2003.

Biography
At nine-years-old, Petri began practicing ballet and is employed as a model and choreographer.

In October 2004 she won a 'Sims Award' as the model with the nicest personality.  She won the contest 'The Heavenly 100' organized by the Flanders' magazine 'Ché' in 2004. She was voted the most beautiful woman on Earth. Second was Beyoncé.   She won the 'Top Fashion Designer Award' at the Miss World 2004 pageant.   She reached third place in the "World's Top Model" (won by Miss Mexico).

References

External links
Official site 

1982 births
Living people
People from Merksem
Belgian female models
Miss World 2004 delegates
Belgian beauty pageant winners
Miss Belgium winners
Flemish models